No Trees in the Street is a 1959 British crime thriller directed by J. Lee Thompson and written by Ted Willis, from his 1948 stage play of the same name.

The film is set in the slums of London. It depicts the life of impoverished teenager Tommy, who becomes a criminal in an attempt at social mobility. He starts with minor thefts and progresses to murder. A subplot involves the romantic involvements of Tommy's sister Hetty, first with a racketeer and then with a policeman.

The film is another example of British kitchen sink realism, but is mainly noted for its naturalistic depiction of slum life.

Plot
Initially, the film's story is told by Frank (Ronald Howard) a local plain clothes policeman in love with Hetty (Sylvia Syms), to a young tearaway Kenny (David Hemmings).

In the slums of London before World War II, Tommy (Melvyn Hayes) is an aimless teenager who tries to escape his squalid surroundings by entering a life of crime. He falls in with local racketeer Wilkie (Herbert Lom), who holds the rest of the slum citizens - including Tommy's own family - in a grip of fear.

For a brief period, Hetty (Tommy's older sister) becomes Wilkie's girlfriend until he humiliates her in front of the other slum citizens simply to show his power over them, after which she will have nothing to do with Wilkie despite him repeatedly asking her to come back to him.

The film chronicles Tommy's sordid progression from minor thefts to murder.

At the end of the film, Hetty and Frank are seen to be married and living in a new council flat long after the slums have been demolished.

Cast
 Sylvia Syms as Hetty
 Herbert Lom as Wilkie
 Melvyn Hayes as Tommy
 Ronald Howard as Frank
 Stanley Holloway as Kipper
 Joan Miller as Jess
 Liam Redmond as Bill
 David Hemmings as Kenny
 Carole Lesley as Lova
 Lily Kann as Mrs Jacobson
 Lloyd Lamble as Superintendent
 Campbell Singer as Inspector
 Marianne Stone as Mrs. Jokel
 Rita Webb as Mrs. Brown
Lana Morris as Marje

Production
Ted Willis based his script on his 1948 play of the same name.

Willis and J. Lee Thompson and Sylvia Syms had previously collaborated together on Woman in a Dressing Gown and Ice Cold in Alex.

Filming began 10 March 1958. The film was revised after previews, with new scenes added at the opening, and at the end showing the detective married the sister.

Critical reception
TV Guide wrote "NO TREES suffers from artificiality of plot and dialog. Characterizations are reduced to mere stereotypes...There are some notable exceptions within the drama, however. Syms is surprisingly moving, giving a sensitive performance despite the film's constraints. Holloway's characterization of a bookie's tout is comical and charming...The camerawork attempts a realistic documentary look, which manages to succeed in capturing the details of slum life that make the setting seem surprisingly naturalistic. The finer points of the film, however, are overshadowed by its faults."

Time Out wrote "released at a time when kitchen sink drama was all the rage, this is an unremarkable 'we had it tough' chronicle from another age."

Variety wrote "Ted Willis is a writer with a sympathetic eye for problems of the middle and lower classes...Syms gives a moving performance as the gentle girl who refuses to marry the cheap racketeer just to escape. Lom, as the opportunist who dominates the street, is sufficiently suave and unpleasant."

References

External links

No Trees in the Street at BFI
No Trees in the Street at Letterbox DVD

1959 films
1950s crime thriller films
British crime thriller films
British black-and-white films
British films based on plays
Films shot at Associated British Studios
Films directed by J. Lee Thompson
Films scored by Laurie Johnson
Films set in London
Films set in the 1930s
Films with screenplays by Ted Willis, Baron Willis
Social realism in film
Films produced by J. Lee Thompson
1950s English-language films
1950s British films